is a private university in Kobe, Hyogo Prefecture, Japan.

History

Fields of study
KIC Graduate School of Information Technology has one Masters course called "Department of Information Systems" which has two courses: ICT Professional Course and ICT Innovator Course.

Course term / degree 
 Normal course term: two years
 Degree: Master of Information Systems

Recognition
KIC ranked #1 among 530 Japanese private universities in terms of the sustainability index, composed of growth of number of students, growth of government research grant, and financial soundness.

KIC has been awarded JICA President Award 2019 to commend the individuals and organizations with preeminent achievements of the socio-economic development in developing countries through Japan International Cooperation Agency's (JICA) international cooperation activities.

Adopted projects
The ICT Innovator Program has been adopted for the promotion of internationalization of universities by the Ministry of Education, Culture, Sports, Science and Technology, and for the project to support human resource development and economic growth of programs in developing countries by the Japan International Cooperation Agency (JICA).

 Industrial human resource development initiative for young people of Africa (ABE initiative)
 The Project for Human Resource Development Scholarship by Japanese Grant Aid (JDS)
 Grass Roots Project 
 Afghanistan “Project for the Promotion and Enhancement of the Afghan Capacity for Effective Development” (PEACE Project)
 Pacific Leaders’ Educational Assistance for Development of State (Pacific-LEADS)
In 2018 Kobe Institute of Computing ventured with Swift Engineering （an American engineering firm, most notable for producing racing cars for a variety of open-wheel racing series, including Formula Ford, Formula Atlantic, the Champ Car World Series and Formula Nippon. From 2000 it diversified into Aerospace/Aviation markets） called Swift Xi located in Kobe, Japan. Kenji Fukuoka, Vice President of KIC is the representative President of Swift Xi Inc.

Academic agreements
KIC partners with institutions around the world to give further chances for the students to develop their skills and international cooperation through programs selected by the Japanese government. 
 Advanced Institute of Industrial Technology, 
 Autonomous University of Bucaramanga, 
 Budapest University of Technology and Economics, 
 Cheng Shiu University, 
 Edith Cowan University, 
 Integrated Polytechnic Regional College Tumba (IPRC TUMBA), 
 Northeastern University (China), 
 Sabancı University, 
 Technical University of Cologne, 
 University of Dhaka, Department of Electrical and Electronic Engineering, 
 University of Hyogo Graduate School of Applied Informatics, 
 University of Rwanda, 
 Vietnam National University,

Notable alumni 
 Akaliza Keza Gara - Rwandan IT activist and entrepreneur

See also
 Colleges of technology in Japan
 Institute of technology
 Education in Japan
 Swift Xi

References

External links 
 KIC - Graduate School of Information Technology
 KIC - College of Computing
 The Bridge
Mr. Shinzo Abe, Prime Minister of Japan, highly evaluated KIC alumnus, Mr. Reimond Ndaisaba, from Rwanda on his role of bridging between Japan and Rwanda in the opening speech of TICAD7.
TICAD 7 Official Side Event Africa/Japan Startups Pitch (Youtube)

Private universities and colleges in Japan
Education in Kobe
Higher education in Japan
Universities and colleges in Hyōgo Prefecture
Buildings and structures in Kobe
Educational institutions established in 2005
2005 establishments in Japan